The 1998 CART PPG/Dayton Indy Lights Championship consisted of 14 races. Future 2002 CART champion and Formula One driver Cristiano da Matta captured four wins on his way to the championship.

Calendar

Race summaries

Homestead race
March 15, 1998
Homestead-Miami Speedway, Miami, Florida
Pole position: Sérgio Paese, 0:30.098,

Long Beach race
April 5, 1998
Long Beach Grand Prix, Long Beach, California
Pole position: Didier André, 0:57.108,

Nazareth race
April 27, 1998
Nazareth Speedway, Nazareth, Pennsylvania
Pole position: Cristiano da Matta, 0:22.408,

Gateway race
Held May 23 at Gateway International Raceway. Jorge Goeters won the pole. No qualifying held due to rain. The line up was based on combined practice times.

Top Five Results
 Shigeaki Hattori
 Philipp Peter
 Cristiano da Matta
 Felipe Giaffone
 Jorge Goeters

Milwaukee race
Held May 31 at The Milwaukee Mile. Sérgio Paese won the pole.

Top Five Results
 Derek Higgins
 Felipe Giaffone
 Sérgio Paese
 Geoff Boss
 Tony Renna

Detroit race
Held June 7 at Belle Isle Raceway. Airton Daré won the pole.

Top Five Results
 Airton Daré
 Cristiano da Matta
 Geoff Boss
 Mark Hotchkis
 Didier André

Portland race
Held June 21 at Portland International Raceway. Guy Smith won the pole.

Top Five Results
 Guy Smith
 Felipe Giaffone
 Luiz Garcia Jr.
 Airton Daré
 Brian Cunningham

Cleveland race
Held July 12 at Burke Lakefront Airport. Luiz Garcia Jr. won the pole.

Top Five Results
 Luiz Garcia Jr.
 Derek Higgins
 Didier André
 Guy Smith
 Tony Renna

Toronto race
Held July 19 at Exhibition Place. Guy Smith won the pole.

Top Five Results
 Guy Smith
 Naoki Hattori
 Chris Simmons
 Philipp Peter
 Didier André

Michigan race
Held July 25 at Michigan International Speedway. Tony Renna won the pole.

Top Five Results
 Tony Renna
 Cristiano da Matta
 Sérgio Paese
 Andy Boss
 Oriol Servià

Trois-Rivières race
Held August 2 at the Trois-Rivières, Quebec Street Circuit. Cristiano da Matta won the pole.

Top Five Results
 Cristiano da Matta
 Oriol Servià
 Naoki Hattori
 Guy Smith
 Didier André

Vancouver race
Held September 6 at Pacific Place. Cristiano da Matta won the pole.

Top Five Results
 Cristiano da Matta
 Derek Higgins
 Airton Daré
 Mike Borkowski
 Felipe Giaffone

Laguna Seca race
Held September 13 at Mazda Raceway Laguna Seca. Didier André won the pole.

Top Five Results
 Didier André
 Oriol Servià
 Derek Higgins
 Geoff Boss
 Naoki Hattori

Fontana race
Held October 31 at The California Speedway. Tony Renna won the pole.

Top Five Results
 Mark Hotchkis
 Felipe Giaffone
 Tony Renna
 Cory Witherill
 Didier André

Final points standings

Driver

For every race the points were awarded: 20 points to the winner, 16 for runner-up, 14 for third place, 12 for fourth place, 10 for fifth place, 8 for sixth place, 6 seventh place, winding down to 1 points for 12th place. Additional points were awarded to the pole winner (1 point) and to the driver leading the most laps (1 point).

Note:

Race 4 no additional point for the qualifying were awarded due to rain.

Complete Overview

R20=retired, but classified NS=did not start NT=no time set in qualifying (3)=place after practice, but grid position not held free

Indy Lights seasons
Indy Lights Season, 1998
Indy Lights
Indy Lights